Lovisa Tuyakula Mulunga (born 18 March 1995) is Namibian footballer who studies at Albany State University and plays as a defender for the Golden Rams, and the Namibia's national team, also known as the Brave Gladiators. She was named the 2011/2012 Namibia Women's Super League Player of the Season.

Mulunga won the NFA Women Super League with JS Academy and was part of the under-20 Zone 6 squad that won the inaugural NFA/DFB Women Super Cup in 2012 after defeating 21 Brigade United by 8–0. Mulunga, captained the Under-17 national women team and has played for the under-20 national team.

Mulunga is considered a versatile player. She was a member of the senior national squad that played in the 2012 African Women Championship qualifiers.

References

External links
 Albany State Golden Rams bio

1995 births
Living people
Namibian women's footballers
Namibia women's international footballers
Women's association football defenders
Albany State Golden Rams women's soccer players
Namibian expatriate women's footballers
Namibian expatriate sportspeople in the United States
Expatriate women's soccer players in the United States
Footballers from Windhoek